The 1961–62 Soviet Championship League season was the 16th season of the Soviet Championship League, the top level of ice hockey in the Soviet Union. Twenty teams participated in the league, and Spartak Moscow won the championship.

Standings

External links
Season on hockeystars.ru

Soviet
Soviet League seasons
1961–62 in Soviet ice hockey